Perula or perule can refer to:

 One of the scales of a leaf bud (also called a perular scale)
 A plant genus in the family Euphorbiaceae, now considered a synonym of Pera
 A plant genus in the family Moraceae, considered a probable synonym of Ficus
 Perula (moth), a genus of moths in the family Pyralinae